This article summarizes Japanese football in the 2023 season.

National teams

Source: JFA

Men's

Senior

U-23

U-20

U-17

Futsal

U-23 futsal

U-20 futsal

Beach soccer

Women's

Senior

U-20

U-17

 Fixtures & Results (W U-16 2023), JFA.jp

Futsal

Club competitions

League (men)

Promotion and relegation

J1 League

J2 League

J3 League

Japan Football League (JFL)

League (women)

Promotion and relegation

WE League

Nadeshiko League

Cup competitions (men)

Fujifilm Super Cup

Emperor's Cup

J.League YBC Levain Cup

Qualified teams:

Cup competitions (women)

WE League Cup

See also
Japan Football Association (JFA)

Notes

References

External links
Japan Football Association (JFA) 
List of International matches – JFA.jp 
Annual schedule of Japan National Teams in 2023, jfa.jp (as of 18 January 2023)

 
2023 in association football
Seasons in Japanese football